Osbaldistone  may refer to:

 Frank Osbaldistone, a character in the book and television series Rob Roy
 Jane Osbaldistone de Trevor de Boulogne, a character in the book and television series Bill the Minder

See also

 Osbaldiston